Chris Handyside is an American music critic and writer for music magazines including Spin and Rolling Stone as well as Detroit alternative newsweekly the Metro Times

He is also the author of "Fell in Love With A Band: The Story of the White Stripes" (St. Martin's Press, 2004) and the "History of American Music" series (Heinemann-Raintree, 2006)

References

American music critics
Living people
Year of birth missing (living people)